The Dragon Gold Cup is an annual sailing race for the Dragon class since 1937, organized by the International Dragon Association and the Clyde Yacht Clubs' Association.

The most successful sailor is Danish Aage Birch, with seven titles, followed by fellow Danish Ole Berntsen, with five titles. In total, Danish crews have won 32 titles.

History
The International Dragon Cup was presented in 1937 by members of the Clyde Yacht's Conference with the intention of bringing together as many competitors of different nationalities as possible for yacht racing in Europe in a friendly spirit, in order to perpetuate the good feeling which existed at the first International Clyde Fortnight. The Clyde Yacht Clubs' Conference has been reconstituted as the Clyde Yacht Clubs' Association and the International Dragon Cup has become known as, and is now renamed, the 'Dragon Gold Cup'.

Members of the Clyde Yacht Clubs' Association created specific rules for this competition and donated a perpetual trophy made of pure gold for an annual international race.
From the beginning, the Gold Cup was considered a family event for the Dragon sailors and could be raced by yachts of the International Dragon Class belonging to any country, and for this reason was a very well attended event.

Until 1965, the year of the first Official World Championship, the Gold Cup was considered the unofficial World Cup. The first rules created by the Clyde Yacht Clubs' Association established that the Cup should be sailed annually and that the Cup should be retained by the winner for one year only. It also established that the event should take place in rotation in the following countries: Scotland, France, Sweden, Germany, Holland and Denmark.

With the revision of the rules in 1997, the number of hosting countries was enlarged to eleven: Belgium, Denmark, France, Germany, Ireland, Netherlands, Norway, Portugal, Spain, Sweden and the United Kingdom.

The hosting country and the Organising Authority continue to be selected by the Clyde Yacht Clubs' Association in conjunction with the International Dragon Association and the number of participants was limited to 120.

Editions

See also 
 Gold Cup (disambiguation)
 Dragon World Championships

References 

Dragon (keelboat) competitions